Bhauri is a village in the Bhopal district of Madhya Pradesh, India. It is located in the Huzur tehsil and the Phanda block.
Bhauri has been included in Bhopal Municipal Corporation in 2015 by Gazette Notification of Government of Madhya Pradesh.
The IISER Bhopal is located in Bhauri, beside the Bhopal Bypass Road.
School of Planning and Architecture (SPA) Bhopal, an Institute of National Importance under Ministry of Human Resource Development, is located in Bhauri village. SPA is accessed by Neelbad Road from Bhopal Bypass. The road is under construction.
Madhya Pradesh Police Academy is also situated in Bhauri village.

Demographics 

According to the 2011 census of India, Bhauri has 575 households. The effective literacy rate (i.e. the literacy rate of population excluding children aged 6 and below) is 77.5%.

References 

Villages in Huzur tehsil